Edward Onslow  (9 April 1758 – 18 October 1829) was a British aristocrat, the younger son of George Onslow, 1st Earl of Onslow. In 1781, Onslow was involved in a homosexual scandal, and was forced to resign his seat in Parliament (by accepting the Stewardship of East Hendred) and flee to France.

Onslow was educated at Christ Church, Oxford, matriculating in 1774. He briefly sat as Member of Parliament for Aldborough in 1780 and was elected the same year as a fellow of the Royal Society.

On 7 March 1783, he married Marie Rosalie de Bourdeilles de Brantôme (d. 1842); one of their sons was George Onslow, the classical composer. Their son Maurice was the father of the French genre painter Édouard Onslow (1830-1904). Marie was possessed of a considerable dowry, and Onslow spent the rest of his life as a country gentleman in France.

References

External links

1758 births
1829 deaths
Alumni of Christ Church, Oxford
English emigrants to France
Members of the Parliament of Great Britain for English constituencies
Younger sons of earls
British MPs 1780–1784
Fellows of the Royal Society
English LGBT politicians
LGBT members of the Parliament of Great Britain
18th-century LGBT people
19th-century British LGBT people
Edward